Independent Division of Shanxi Provincial Military District(1st Formation) was formed in July 1966 from the Public Security Contingent of Shanxi province. The division was composed of six regiments (1st to 6th).

In March 1969 6th Infantry Regiment was detached. The division with 5 of its regiments moved to Inner Mongolia and renamed as Independent Division of Inner Mongolian Military District().

The division HQ stationed in Huhhot.

The division was then a "behind the enemy line" formation, composing of 5 lightly-armed infantry regiments, without any artillery pieces.

In 1971 5th Regiment was disbanded. All regiments received support weapons, i.e. mortars and recoilless rifles.

From April 1976 the division was converted to a "field army" formation. Its 4th Regiment became Artillery Regiment, composing of 1 160-mm mortar battalion, 1 122-mm howitzer battalion, 1 107-mm rocket artillery battalion and 1 85-mm AT gun battalion.

In May 1983 the division was renamed as 30th Army Division(). All its regiments were re-designated as follows:
88th Infantry Regiment;
89th Infantry Regiment;
90th Infantry Regiment;
Artillery Regiment.

In September 1985 the division was disbanded. 2 of its regiments were transferred to People's Armed Police, and the other 2 were transferred to 6th Garrison Division of Beijing Military Region.

References
中国各省军区独立师的历史沿革, https://web.archive.org/web/20160918225002/http://www.360doc.com/content/13/1205/20/1164894_334784330.shtml
中国人民解放军各步兵师沿革，http://blog.sina.com.cn/s/blog_a3f74a990101cp1q.html

030
Military units and formations disestablished in 1985
Military units and formations established in 1966